Nane Germon (1909–2001) was a French television and film actress.

Selected filmography

 Coup de feu à l'aube (1932)
 A Weak Woman (1933)
 Le rayon des amours (1933) - Nicole
 Les aventures du roi Pausole (1933) - Nicole
 Court Waltzes (1933)
 Les aventures du roi Pausole (1933) - Nicole
 Le grillon du foyer (1933)
 Le bien-aimé Lanouille (1933)
 J'ai une idée (1934) - Norah
 The Barber of Seville (1934) - Fanchette
 Le malade imaginaire (1934) - Toinette
 Pension Mimosas (1935) - La soubrette (uncredited)
 Marchand d'amour (1935)
 Juanita (1935) - Elaine Georgesco
 Madame Angot's Daughter (1935) - Hersilie
 Divine (1935) - Zaza
 Merchant of Love (1935) - Denise
 Mayerling (1936) - Anna Vetsera
 Taras Bulba (1936) - Zelma
 Le train d'amour (1936)
 Forty Little Mothers (1936) - Simone
 Notre-Dame d'amour (1936) - Zanette
 Hercule (1938) - Miette
 Bar du sud (1938) - Gisèle
 Les filles du Rhône (1938)
 Ma soeur de lait (1938) - Isabelle
 Accord final (1938) - Marie Poupard
 Girls in Distress (1939) - Ernestine
 Remorques (1941) - Renée Tanguy
 At Your Command, Madame (1942) - Léa
 Coup de feu dans la nuit (1943) - Pauline
 Vautrin the Thief (1943) - Madame Camusot
 Beauty and the Beast (1946) - Adélaïde
 Le café du cadran (1947) - Jeanne
 Return to Life (1949) - Henriette (segment 1 : "Le retour de tante Emma")
 Le crime des justes (1950) - Madame Combaroux
 Justice Is Done (1950) - Marie Malingré
 The Red Inn (1951) - Elisa
 The Lottery of Happiness (1953)
 Madame du Barry (1954) - Mlle du Barry
 People of No Importance (1956) - Mme Cussac
 Meeting in Paris (1956) - (uncredited)
 Irresistible Catherine (1957) - Mme Martin
 La bête à l'affût (1959) - Un dame au restaurant
 Le travail c'est la liberté (1959) - La mère d'Odette
 The Long Absence (1961) - Simone
 The Seven Deadly Sins (1962) - La dame au café (segment "Colère, La")
 Carillons sans joie (1962) - La mère de Léa
 La belle vie (1963) - L'amie riche
 Life Upside Down (1964) - La mère
 L'or du duc (1965)
 Le Chant du monde (1965) - Junie
 The Thief of Paris (1967) - Mme Voisin
 I Killed Rasputin (1967) - A follower of Rasputin
 Le 13ème caprice (1967)
 Les Biches (1968) - Violetta
 La mandarine (1972) - La sage-femme
 Monsieur Balboss (1975)
 Body of My Enemy (1976) - Mme Kelfer (uncredited)
 Diva (1981) - La vieille dame
 La femme ivoire (1984) - Mme Perrein
 Corentin, ou Les infortunes conjugales (1988) - La paysanne
 My Life Is Hell (1991) - La dame âgée église
 Pourquoi maman est dans mon lit? (1994)
 The City of Lost Children (1995) - Miette, Age 82

References

Bibliography
 Goble, Alan. The Complete Index to Literary Sources in Film. Walter de Gruyter, 1999.

External links

1909 births
2001 deaths
French film actresses
French television actresses
Actresses from Paris
20th-century French actresses